The 1998 Spring Stampede was the third Spring Stampede pay-per-view (PPV) event produced by World Championship Wrestling (WCW). The event took place on April 19, 1998 from the Denver Coliseum in Denver, Colorado. The main event was a no disqualification match  between Sting and Randy Savage for the WCW World Heavyweight Championship.

Featured matches on the undercard were Diamond Dallas Page versus Raven in a Raven's Rules match for the WCW United States Heavyweight Championship, Hollywood Hogan and Kevin Nash versus Roddy Piper and The Giant in a Baseball Bat on a Pole match and Lex Luger and Rick Steiner versus Scott Steiner and Buff Bagwell in a tag team match.

Storylines
The event featured wrestlers from pre-existing scripted feuds and storylines. Wrestlers portrayed villains, heroes, or less distinguishable characters in the scripted events that built tension and culminated in a wrestling match or series of matches.

Reception
In 2016, Kevin Pantoja of 411Mania gave the event a rating of 4.5 [Poor], stating, "There was certainly some potential on this show. The Television Title, United States Title and Chavo/Ultimo Dragon matches were good stuff. Most of the event was filled with the classic WCW overbooking and referee bumps. There were a few matches that were absolutely dreadful, but there are some things worth a look. Check out the matches I mentioned and skip the rest."

Results

References

Spring Stampede
1998 in Colorado
Professional wrestling shows in Colorado
Events in Denver
April 1998 events in the United States
1998 World Championship Wrestling pay-per-view events